The Six Wives of Henry VIII were the wives of Henry VIII, i.e. the six queens consort wedded to Henry between 1509 and 1547.

The Six Wives of Henry VIII may also refer to:

The Six Wives of Henry VIII (1970 TV series), a 1970 BBC TV miniseries
Henry VIII and His Six Wives, a 1972 film adaptation of the BBC TV miniseries
The Six Wives of Henry VIII (album), a 1973 album by Rick Wakeman
The Six Wives of Henry VIII Live at Hampton Court Palace, a 2009 live album based on Wakeman's original release
The Six Wives of Henry VIII (book), a 1991 book by Alison Weir
The Six Wives of Henry VIII, a 1993 book by Antonia Fraser
The Six Wives of Henry VIII (2001 TV series), a 2001 documentary series by David Starkey
The Six Wives of Henry VIII, a 2016 miniseries presented and partially narrated by Dan Jones and Suzannah Lipscomb
 Six (musical), a 2017 musical comedy

See also
Cultural depictions of Henry VIII